Martin Jullum (born 15 June 1988) is a Norwegian orienteer. He's a multiple time world champion in trail orienteering, in both PreO and TempO. He defended his PhD thesis at the Department of Mathematics, University of Oslo in 2016.

References

External links
 

Living people
Norwegian orienteers
Male orienteers
Trail orienteers
World Orienteering Championships medalists
1988 births
University of Oslo alumni
20th-century Norwegian people
21st-century Norwegian people